The following is the complete discography of British singer Rod Stewart. Throughout his career, Stewart has sold 120 million records worldwide, making him one of the world's best-selling music artists in history. According to Recording Industry Association of America (RIAA), he has sold 46.6 million albums & singles in the US. Billboard ranked him as the 15th Greatest Artist of all time (6th among male soloist). He is also the 20th Greatest Hot 100 artist of all time and the 13th Greatest Billboard 200 Artist of all time.

Albums

Studio albums

Live albums

Compilation albums

Singles

1960s/70s

1980s

1990s

2000s

2010s

2020s

Note:
 [A] Also included on previous albums.

1 Although "Reason to Believe" was the A-side, the single was listed on the UK chart as "Maggie May/Reason to Believe".
2 "In a Broken Dream" was credited to Python Lee Jackson and released as a single in late 1969. However, the single did not chart in the UK until 1972.
3 "What's Made Milwaukee Famous (Has Made a Loser Out of Me)" was released as a double A-side with "Angel" in the UK and Ireland.
4 "You Can Make Me Dance ..." was credited to Rod Stewart/Faces, at least in the UK.
5 "Sailing" was in 1976 used as the theme music for the BBC documentary series Sailor, about HMS Ark Royal, and when it was subsequently re-released it reached number 3 on the UK Singles Chart. In 1987, the song made a new chart appearance in the UK when re-released as a charity single after the Zeebrugge ferry disaster, reaching number 41 on the chart. The 1987 release also made number 30 in Ireland.
6 "The First Cut Is the Deepest" and "I Don't Want to Talk About It" were released as a double A-side in the UK in 1977. Internationally, the former was released in 1977 and the latter in 1979. However, a newly recorded version of "I Don't Want to Talk About It", included on the Stewart anthology Storyteller, was a number 2 hit on the Billboard Adult Contemporary chart in 1990; it did not chart on the Billboard Hot 100 as it was not available as a retail single.

See also

with The Jeff Beck Group
 Truth (1968)
 Beck-Ola (1969)

with Faces
 First Step (1970)
 Long Player (1971)
 A Nod Is As Good As a Wink... to a Blind Horse (1971)
 Ooh La La (1973)

Other appearances

Video releases

Music videos

Cameos and other appearances

References

External links
 

Rock music discographies
Discographies of British artists
Discography